Tim G. Rounds (born November 17, 1959) is an American politician and a Republican member of the South Dakota House of Representatives representing District 24 since January 11, 2013. Rounds previously served non-consecutively from January 2003 until January 2011 in the District 24 seat, but took a break from the House due to the state's term limits.

Education
Rounds earned his BS from Black Hills State University.

Elections
In 2012, incumbent Republican state Representative Tad Perry ran for South Dakota Senate and left a District 24 seat open, Rounds ran in the three-way June 5, 2012 Republican Primary and placed second with 2,288 votes (34.1%) ahead of incumbent Representative Mark Venner, who placed third; Rounds and fellow Republican nominee Mary Duvall were unopposed for the November 6, 2012 General election, where Rounds took the first seat with 7,248 votes (54.08%) and Duvall took the second seat.

In 2002, incumbent Republican Representative Jeff Monroe ran for South Dakota Senate and Republican Representative Cooper Garnos was redistricted to District 26 leaving both District 24 seats open, Rounds ran in the four-way June 4, 2002 Republican Primary and placed first with 3,738 votes (42.6%); in the four-way November 5, 2002 General election Rounds took the first seat with 5,714 votes (30.1%) and fellow Republican nominee Ryan Olson took the second seat ahead of Democratic nominees Ann Thompson and Peggy Cruse.

In 2004, Rounds and Republican Representative Olson were unopposed for both the June 1, 2004 Republican Primary and the November 2, 2004 General election where Rounds took the first seat with 7,956 votes (57.3%) and Representative Olson took the second seat.

In 2006, Rounds and Republican Representative Olson were unopposed for both the June 6, 2006 Republican Primary and the November 7, 2006 General election where Representative Olson took the first seat and Rounds took the second seat with 6,026 votes (47.9%).

In 2008, Rounds and Republican Representative Olson were challenged for both the three-way June 3, 2008 Republican Primary where Rounds placed second with 2,613 votes (35.8%) and the four-way November 4, 2008 General election where Representative Olson took the first seat and Rounds took the second seat with 5,963 votes (31.0%) ahead of Democratic nominees Jodi Owen and Ann Eichinger. Rounds and Representative Olson were both term limited and left the Legislature after the end of the term, having served eight years side by side.

Personal life
Tim Rounds is the younger brother of the 31st Governor of South Dakota and U.S. Senator Mike Rounds.

References

External links
Official page at the South Dakota Legislature
 

1959 births
Living people
Black Hills State University alumni
Republican Party members of the South Dakota House of Representatives
People from Pierre, South Dakota
21st-century American politicians